Giannis Bouzoukis (Greek: Γιάννης Μπουζούκης; born 27 March 1998) is a Greek professional footballer who plays as an attacking midfielder for Super League club Panetolikos.

Career

Panathinaikos
Bouzoukis plays mainly as a midfielder and joined Panathinaikos from Preveza.
On 26 August 2018, thanks to an astonishing long-range effort by the talented winger, Panathinaikos achieved a vital 1–0 away win against rivals Xanthi, in the first matchday of the 2018–19 season. It was his first goal as a professional player. On 1 September 2018, Bouzoukis scored his second consecutive goal against Lamia.
On 13 January 2019, Bouzoukis helped Panathinaikos to recover well though after half-time when he fired home a precise low shot after picking up possession at the back post following a deep left-wing cross, equalizing for his club in a final 2–2 home draw against Xanthi.
On 30 January 2019, the 20-year-old forward slid the ball home from close range to round off a superb fast-flowing move down the left flank with Tasos Chatzigiovanis feeding Federico Macheda, whose cross was perfect for the young international who scored the only goal in an away win against Panetolikos.

During this season, Bouzoukis has attracted several rival clubs such as champions-elect PAOK from expressing an interest in the talented young midfielder. Key Panathinaikos players would only be sold should the financial situation at the club become even more dire, but the preference of technical director Nikos Dabizas in such a scenario, would be to sell to overseas clubs, such as Portuguese giants Benfica that have reportedly expressed an interest and look set to make a €2 million bid for Bouzoukis, who is one of the most sought after young Greek footballers. However, Panathinaikos would be demanding at least double, with reports suggesting the Greens would not consider anything below €5 million.

On 7 July 2019, Bouzoukis has agreed to terms on a new and improved contract which runs until the summer of 2022. Bouzoukis now has the opportunity to develop his game at his boyhood club and become a vital player the team can be built around. His resale value should peak over the next few seasons as he continues to flourish and attract serious attention from abroad, which will assist the club’s finances in the long-term.

On 25 January 2020, Bouzoukis scored his first goal for the season with a penalty kick in a 2–0 away win against AEL.

OFI
On 31 January 2022, OFI announced an agreement with Panathinaikos for the transfer of Giannis Bouzoukis for the next 2,5 years, until the summer of 2024.

Career statistics

Club

Honours

Individual
Super League Greece Best Young Player of the Year: 2018–19

References

External links

 
 
 

1998 births
Living people
Greek footballers
Greece under-21 international footballers
Greece youth international footballers
Panathinaikos F.C. players
OFI Crete F.C. players
Super League Greece players
Association football midfielders
Footballers from Preveza